The Cathedral-Basilica of Notre-Dame de Québec ("Our Lady of Quebec City"), located at 16, rue de Buade, Quebec City, Quebec, is the primatial church of the Roman Catholic Archdiocese of Quebec.  It is the oldest church in Canada and was the first church in Canada to be elevated to the rank of minor basilica, by Pope Pius IX in 1874. Four governors of New France and the bishops of Quebec are buried in the crypt, including François de Laval, Quebec's first bishop.

The church is a National Historic Site of Canada, and located within the UNESCO World Heritage Site of Historic District of Old Québec.

History 
The cathedral is located on the site of a chapel, Notre Dame de la Recouvrance, constructed by Samuel de Champlain in 1633. Construction of the first cathedral building began in 1647, and it was given the name Notre-Dame de la Paix.

The cathedral has twice been destroyed by fire, the first time being during the Siege of Quebec in 1759. It was rebuilt from plans by Gaspard-Joseph Chaussegros de Léry draughted in 1743.  The belltower, however, was designed by Jean Baillairgé, who also oversaw construction. The interior was designed by Jean Baillairgé and his son François from 1786 to 1822. In 1843, François' son, Thomas, suggested a reconstruction of the façade to resemble the church of Sainte-Geneviève in Paris, resulting in the finest Neo-classic façade in Québec. The cathedral was richly decorated with impressive works of art: baldaquin, canopy, episcopal throne dais, stained glass windows, paintings, and chancel lamp (a gift of Louis XIV). 
 
In 1922 the church was again gutted by fire, this time by the Canadian faction of the Ku Klux Klan, and restored by architects Maxime Roisin and Raoul Chenevert. Raoul Chenevert added a presbytery beside the cathedral in 1931–1932.

In 2014 the cathedral celebrated its 350th anniversary. As part of the celebrations, a holy door was constructed—the second outside Europe and only the eighth in the world. The holy door was opened on December 8, 2013, and remained open until December 28, 2014. It again opened from December 8, 2015, to November 20, 2016, for the Year of Mercy after which it was sealed until 2025.

The cathedral was designated as a national historic site of Canada in 1989 because "...of its long and close associations with the history of New France; its influence on subsequent ecclesiastical architecture and interior decoration in Québec."

Gallery

See also
 Jean Lemire, the master carpenter who constructed the south steeple of an early iteration of the church, 1684
 List of cathedrals in Canada
 Roman Catholic Marian churches

References

External links

 

Notre Dame de Quebec
Roman Catholic churches in Quebec City
Roman Catholic cathedrals in Quebec
National Historic Sites in Quebec
Roman Catholic churches completed in 1843
19th-century Roman Catholic church buildings in Canada
Roman Catholic churches completed in 1922
Burned buildings and structures in Canada
Rebuilt churches in Canada
Roman Catholic churches on the National Historic Sites of Canada register
Heritage buildings of Quebec
1843 establishments in Canada
Neoclassical church buildings in Canada
20th-century religious buildings and structures in Canada